The men's 10,000 metres at the 2019 Asian Athletics Championships was held on 21 April.

Results

References
Results

10000
10,000 metres at the Asian Athletics Championships